Najat El Garaa (Arabic: نجاة الكرعة) is a Paralympian athlete from Morocco competing mainly in category F40 discus throw events.

Career
El Garaa competed in the 2008 Summer Paralympics in Beijing, China. There she won a bronze medal in the women's F40 discus throw event.

She later competed in the 2012 Summer Paralympics in London where she won a gold medal in the women's F40 discus throw event. El Garaa made a new World record 32.37 metres.

El Garaa was declared Moroccan sportswoman of the year in 2012 and also took Sheikh Mohamed Bin Rashid Al Maktoum's Creative Sports Award.

Personal life
Her sisters Laila and Hayat are both Paralympic medalists.

References

External links
 

Paralympic athletes of Morocco
Athletes (track and field) at the 2008 Summer Paralympics
Athletes (track and field) at the 2012 Summer Paralympics
Paralympic bronze medalists for Morocco
Paralympic gold medalists for Morocco
Living people
World record holders in Paralympic athletics
Moroccan female discus throwers
Moroccan female shot putters
Year of birth missing (living people)
Medalists at the 2008 Summer Paralympics
Medalists at the 2012 Summer Paralympics
Paralympic medalists in athletics (track and field)
Powerlifters at the 2020 Summer Paralympics
21st-century Moroccan women